The Art of the Steal (also known as The Black Marks and The Fix) is a 2013 Canadian comedy film written and directed by Jonathan Sobol. It stars Kurt Russell, Jay Baruchel, Chris Diamantopoulos, Matt Dillon and Katheryn Winnick. It was shown at the 2013 Toronto International Film Festival.

Plot

Crunch Calhoun begins with a soliloquy as he starts a seven-year sentence in a Polish prison, courtesy of his brother, Nicky. A flashback reveals the heist involving the two men that went wrong; resulting in Nicky's capture and subsequent betrayal of Crunch. 

Once released, Crunch works as a motorcycle daredevil alongside girlfriend Lola and an apprentice, Francie. Meanwhile, Nicky steals a painting by Georges Seurat with the help of a partner whom he double crosses. The partner seeks out and threatens Crunch to get information on Nicky's whereabouts. Shortly afterwards, Crunch informs an old colleague of his, "Uncle" Paddy, that he's ready to work again. At Paddy's, he and Francie run into Nicky.

"Uncle" Paddy explains that a priceless historical book needs to be stolen from a Customs warehouse in Canada and taken to the buyer's middle man in Detroit. The payout is over a million dollars so they agree. 

Crunch insists on recruiting an old partner, Guy de Cornet, for his skills and talent in forgery. Cornet creates an exact replica of the book which Crunch takes through the Canadian border station hidden inside a peculiar piece of art. An identity check prompts the police to impound his art, as planned, in the same facility where the historical book is being held. 

Meanwhile, Guy de Cornet passes as an art authentication expert and enters the facility, replacing the real book with the forgery and hiding the real one within Crunch's art piece. After Canadian border patrol clears Crunch's name, he goes to the facility and reclaims his art piece.

The team is in the process of taking the book to the buyer when Nicky persuades Crunch to keep it and forge multiple duplicates to sell to multiple buyers at the same time, netting them several times the original payout. They run into a snag when Cornet reveals that in order for him to create forgeries that would pass such tests as carbon dating and professional scrutiny, they would need $750,000. Each person names an amount they could chip in and after some persuasion, Crunch agrees to fund the remaining amount. 

They agree not to contact one another until the required month has passed to conduct the transaction. Sometime during this month, Nicky secretly plots to create his own cheaper forgeries and beat his team at selling them to the same buyers. 

Nicky calls the original buyer and informs him that there will be a delay, but the buyer claims to know nothing about the deal. A frantic Nicky calls all people and organizations involved in the heist, learning to his dismay that they either could not be reached or had no knowledge of the book. 

Meanwhile, Crunch explains to his apprentice Francie how the historical book was a fabricated ploy. Its true purpose was to steal the Georges Seurat painting from Nicky and make a great deal of money using Nicky's idea of multiple forgeries. 

Flashbacks reveal that Francie was the only one who did not know of the alternate plan. Meanwhile, Interpol receive an anonymous tip as to the whereabouts of Nicky and the painting that he stole from the partner that he double crossed earlier. 

The ending reveals the last player in Crunch's plan, an old reformed colleague of his by the name of Samuel Winters, who had been paired with the Interpol agent who had been watching them at the start of the plan.

Cast

Production

Filming
The Amsterdam scene was filmed in Strada Nicolae Tonitza, in Bucharest, Romania.

The aerial pictures establishing "Warsaw" actually show Budapest, Hungary.

Post-production
In January 2013, the film originally titled The Black Marks changed to The Fix. In March 2013, the movie changed titles again, from The Fix to The Art of the Steal.

Reception

Critical response
On Rotten Tomatoes, the film has an approval rating of 44% based on reviews from 50 critics, with an average rating of 5.4/10. The website's critical consensus reads: "It boasts a terrific cast led by the always-watchable Kurt Russell and Terence Stamp, but The Art of the Steal wastes its stars on a formulaic plot that borrows too obviously from superior heist pictures." On Metacritic the film has a weighted average score of 53 out of 100 based on 19 reviews, indicating "mixed or average reviews".

Justin Chang of Variety wrote, "This lightly amusing heist-movie riff feels as disposable as the numerous counterfeit paintings that exchange hands throughout." John DeFore of The Hollywood Reporter called it an "enjoyable heist pic [that] is more talk than action". Neil Genzlinger of The New York Times called it "a fairly amusing heist film" with a convoluted plot. Robert Abele of the Los Angeles Times wrote, "The actors give it punch, but in the grand scheme of caper comedies, The Art of the Steal is more breathlessly imitative than authentic."

Richard Roeper of the Chicago Sun-Times wrote, "It’s like a low-budget, Canadian version of Ocean's 11, with about half as many characters and about one-tenth the charm and style." Peter Bradshaw of The Guardian rated it 3/5 stars and called it a "heist caper with a swinging-60s feel" with "a lovable-rogue crew of triple-crossers, every one of whom may be scamming the others." Robbie Collin of The Daily Telegraph rated it 2/5 stars and called it a "contrived crime caper" that "borrows from the Guy Ritchie stylebook".

Neil Smith of Total Film rated it 2/5 stars and called it a derivative film that makes viewers feel conned. Angie Errigo of Empire rated it 3/5 stars and called it "conventional to an almost eye-watering degree". Linda Barnard of the Toronto Star rated it 2/5 stars and called it a homage to 1960s European heist films that is "a series of vignettes featuring smart quipping stars randomly strung together". Scott A. Gray of Exclaim! wrote, "The Art of the Steal is a good example of criminal misdirection though: by the time you realize these slick images are completely empty, your money will already be gone." James Adams of The Globe and Mail called it a "lightweight, utterly implausible adventure".

References

External links
 
 The Art of the Steal at Library and Archives Canada

2013 films
2010s crime comedy films
2010s heist films
Films shot in Hamilton, Ontario
Canadian crime comedy films
Canadian heist films
English-language Canadian films
Films shot in Toronto
Films directed by Jonathan Sobol
2013 comedy films
2010s English-language films
2010s Canadian films